Evgeny Kirillov (born 14 July 1987) is a Russian professional tennis player. On July 26, 2010, he reached his highest ATP singles ranking of 206.

ATP tournaments finals

Titles (7)

References

External links
 
 

1987 births
Living people
People from Mytishchi
Russian male tennis players
Universiade medalists in tennis
Universiade silver medalists for Russia
Medalists at the 2005 Summer Universiade
Sportspeople from Moscow Oblast